Lindley's paradox is a counterintuitive situation in statistics in which the Bayesian and frequentist approaches to a hypothesis testing problem give different results for certain choices of the prior distribution.  The problem of the disagreement between the two approaches was discussed in Harold Jeffreys' 1939 textbook; it became known as  Lindley's paradox after Dennis Lindley called the disagreement a paradox in a 1957 paper.

Although referred to as a paradox, the differing results from the Bayesian and frequentist approaches can be explained as using them to answer fundamentally different questions, rather than actual disagreement between the two methods.

Nevertheless, for a large class of priors the differences between the frequentist and Bayesian approach are caused by keeping the significance level fixed: as even Lindley recognized,  "the theory does not justify the practice of keeping the significance level fixed'' and even "some computations by Prof. Pearson in the discussion to that paper emphasized how the significance level would have to change with the sample size, if the losses and prior probabilities were kept fixed.'' In fact, if the critical value increases with the sample size suitably fast, then the disagreement between the frequentist and Bayesian approaches becomes negligible as the sample size increases.

Description of the paradox

Lindley's paradox occurs when

These results can occur at the same time when  is very specific,  more diffuse, and the prior distribution does not strongly favor one or the other, as seen below.

Numerical example
The following numerical example illustrates Lindley's paradox. In a certain city 49,581 boys and 48,870 girls have been born over a certain time period. The observed proportion  of male births is thus 49,581/98,451 ≈ 0.5036. We assume the fraction of male births is a binomial variable with parameter . We are interested in testing whether  is 0.5 or some other value.

Frequentist approach
The frequentist approach to testing  is to compute a p-value, the probability of observing a fraction of boys at least as large as  assuming  is true.

We would have been equally surprised if we had seen 49,581 female births, i.e. , so a frequentist would usually perform a two-sided test, for which the p-value would be . In both cases, the p-value is lower than the significance level, α, of 5%, so the frequentist approach rejects  as it disagrees with the observed data.

Bayesian approach
Assuming no reason to favor one hypothesis over the other, the Bayesian approach would be to assign prior probabilities  and a uniform distribution to  under , and then to compute the posterior probability of  using Bayes' theorem,

After observing  boys out of  births, we can compute the posterior probability of each hypothesis using the probability mass function for a binomial variable,

where  is the Beta function.

The two approaches—the Bayesian and the frequentist—appear to be in conflict, and this is the "paradox".

Reconciling the Bayesian and frequentist approaches

Almost sure hypothesis testing 

At least in the numerical example, taking , results in a significance level of 0.00318, so the frequentist would not reject the null hypothesis, which is in agreement with the Bayesian approach.

Uninformative priors 

If we use an uninformative prior and test a hypothesis more similar to that in the frequentist approach, the paradox disappears.

 

If we use this to check the probability that a newborn is more likely to be a boy than a girl, i.e. , we find
 

In other words, it is very likely that the proportion of male births is above 0.5.

Neither analysis gives an estimate of the effect size, directly, but both could be used to determine, for instance, if the fraction of boy births is likely to be above some particular threshold.

The lack of an actual paradox

The apparent disagreement between the two approaches is caused by a combination of factors. To understand why, it is helpful to consider the two hypotheses as generators of the observations:
 Under , we choose , and ask how likely it is to see 49,581 boys in 98,451 births.
 Under , we choose  randomly from anywhere within 0 to 1, and ask the same question.
Most of the possible values for  under  are very poorly supported by the observations.  In essence, the apparent disagreement between the methods is not a disagreement at all, but rather two different statements about how the hypotheses relate to the data:
 The frequentist finds that  is a poor explanation for the observation.

The ratio of the sex of newborns is improbably 50/50 male/female, according to the frequentist test. Yet 50/50 is a better approximation than most, but not all, other ratios. The hypothesis  would have fit the observation much better than almost all other ratios, including .

For example, this choice of hypotheses and prior probabilities implies the statement: "if  > 0.49 and  < 0.51, then the prior probability of  being exactly 0.5 is 0.50/0.51  98%."

Clearly this is dubious. In fact if you were to picture real numbers as being continuous, then it would be more logical to assume that it would impossible for any given number to be exactly the parameter value, i.e., we should assume .

Recent discussion
The paradox continues to be a source of active discussion.

See also
Bayes factor

Notes

Further reading
 

Statistical hypothesis testing
Statistical paradoxes
Bayesian statistics